Arcola is an unincorporated community in May Township, Washington County, Minnesota, United States.  Arcola is located in the southeast part of May Township along State Highway 95 (MN 95).  The northeast part of Stillwater Township is also in the immediate area.  Nearby places include Stillwater and Marine on St. Croix.

Arcola was first settled circa 1847.  The John and Martin Mower House and Arcola Mill Site, around which the community was founded, is listed on the National Register of Historic Places.

References

Unincorporated communities in Washington County, Minnesota
Unincorporated communities in Minnesota